Padhye Brahmin community hails from Goa, commonly known as "Bhatt", they speak a unique dialect of Konkani known as "Bhati Bhasha".

Early history
The reference to Padye Brahmins is found in the section of Karahastrabrahmanotpatti of Sahyadrikhanda. It is commonly believed that Padye Brahmins are not different from the Karhades and are a section of Karhade Brahmins. However, even now Padye Brahmins have retained their identity.

Origin of the word Padye
The name Padye is supposed to have its origin in the Sumerian word Patesi. But it can be also concluded that 'Padhye' or 'Padye' is a corrupted form of the Sanskrit word 'Upadhyay' which means a 'teacher'.

Later history
With due course of time, they seem to have undergone thorough Sanskritisation and have been included into Brahminic fourfold system and attained status that of a Brahmin (i.e. during the rule of Yadavas and Kadambas in Goa when they were given lands by the monarchs and the title of Deshapati (now corrupted as Dessai) was bestowed upon many of them).

The Padyes from Goa and are believed to have migrated to Maharashtra, then returned to Goa a few centuries later. It is believed that the name Karhade comes from the place Karhatak (present day Karhad) in Maharashtra, where they lived. The Shiledars of Kolhapur conquered south Konkan and got these priests with them back to Goa.

Mythological origins
Skanda Purana (Sahyadri Khanda) as well as Brahmanda Purana are very harsh towards Karhade Brahmins and it is mentioned that they descended from the bones of camel and hence designated as Karhades.

Later Brahminic classification
Padhyes later were included in to the Pancha Dravida group of Brahmins and are now commonly considered a sub-caste of the Karhade Brahmin community, though not historically. They are essentially Rigvedi Brahmins and follow the Ashwalayana Sutra. Padhyes belong to 13 Gotras and are predominantly Smarthas and worship different aspects of Shakti and Shiva.

Kuldevatas
Padhyes worship following deities as their Kuldevta
 Navadurga
 Vijayadurga
 Aryadurga
 Mahalasa
 Kamakshi
 Mahalakshmi
 Santeri

See also
Bhati Bhasha
Bhatt Prabhu

Notes

References
"People of India: Goa" - Page 107 by Kumar Suresh Singh, Prakashchandra P. Shirodkar, Pra. Pā Śiroḍakara, Anthropological Survey of India, H. K. Mandal - Social Science - 1993 - 283 pages
 Gomantak Prakruti ani sanskruti Part 01 to 03 By B. D. Satoskar.. Page 160,161,162.

Brahmin communities of Goa
Konkani